Cecilie Greve (born 19 January 1992) is a Danish handball player for Nykøbing Falster Håndboldklub and the Danish national team.

References

1992 births
Living people
Danish female handball players
Nykøbing Falster Håndboldklub players
People from Roskilde
Sportspeople from Region Zealand